16S rRNA (guanine1516-N2)-methyltransferase (yhiQ (gene), rsmJ (gene), m2G1516 methyltransferase) is an enzyme with systematic name S-adenosyl-L-methionine:16S rRNA (guanine1516-N2)-methyltransferase. This enzyme catalyses the following chemical reaction

 S-adenosyl-L-methionine + guanine1516 in 16S rRNA  S-adenosyl-L-homocysteine + N2-methylguanine1516 in 16S rRNA

The enzyme specifically methylates guanine1516 at N2 in 16S rRNA.

References

External links 
 

EC 2.1.1